Lyons is an unincorporated community and census-designated place located in the town of Lyons, in Walworth County, Wisconsin, United States. Lyons has a post office with ZIP code 53148. It was first named a CDP at the 2020 census, which showed a population of 932.

Demographics

References

Census-designated places in Walworth County, Wisconsin
Census-designated places in Wisconsin